The Savalai hairtail, Lepturacanthus savala, also known as Small-head hairtail, is a species of cutlassfish native to the Indian Ocean and into the west Pacific Ocean as far east as Australia. The fish comes surface of the water at night to catch small fish, and crustaceans, specially the prawns.

References 

 Itis.org
 Animaldiversity Web
 WoRMS
 Fish journal

Trichiuridae
Fish described in 1828
Taxa named by Georges Cuvier